Elizabeth Talford Scott (February 7, 1916 – April 25, 2011) was an American folk artist, known for her quilts.

Early life
Elizabeth Caldwell was born near Chester, South Carolina, where her family lived as sharecroppers on the Blackstock Plantation, on the land where her grandparents had been enslaved.  She was the sixth of fourteen children (seven brothers and seven sisters) born to Mary Jane and Samuel Caldwell, and the third female. Elizabeth grew up in a family of craftspeople who practiced pottery, metalwork, basketry, quilting and knitting. They were also storytellers. Both her parents made quilts, and Elizabeth learned to quilt by the age of 9. Her father was a railroad worker who collected fabric scraps in his travels, and he colored the scraps using natural dyes that he made from berries and clay. In 1940, during the Great Migration, Elizabeth moved north to Baltimore, Maryland to escape bigotry and to seek greater economic opportunities.<ref name="articles.baltimoresun.com">[http://articles.baltimoresun.com/2011-05-03/news/bs-md-ob-elizabeth-scott-20110503_1_quilt-art-school-new-shapes Jacques Kelly, Elizabeth Scott, Quilt Maker, Died," Baltimore Sun (May 3, 2011).]</ref>

Career
In Baltimore, Elizabeth Talford Scott worked long hours as a domestic servant, a nanny, and a cook, and stopped quilting from around 1940-1970. Upon her retirement from these other jobs, Elizabeth took up quilting again, and soon developed her unique style that expanded upon the traditional strip piecing that she had learned from her family. In addition to piecework, these new quilts often incorporated embroidery, appliqué, bead work, sequins, plastic netting and found objects such as stones, buttons and shells. Her quilts evolved into dense compositions, often abstract and asymmetrical, with references to family rituals, personal stories, and the rural environment of her childhood. Elizabeth regularly presented workshops and demonstrations, and frequently collaborated with her daughter, artist Joyce J. Scott, to educate students about her craft. The quilts of Elizabeth Talford Scott were exhibited at the Pennsylvania Academy of Fine Arts, the Walters Art Museum, the Baltimore Museum of Art, and in New York at the Museum of Biblical Art, the Studio Museum of Harlem, the Museum of American Folk Art, and the Metropolitan Museum of Art.

In 1987, Scott received the Women's Caucus for Art Lifetime Achievement Award. In 1990, Elizabeth and her daughter were featured in the film The Silver Needle: The Legacy of Elizabeth and Joyce Scott. In 1998, the Maryland Institute College of Art held a retrospective of Scott's work, Eyewinkers, Tumbleturds and Candlebugs: The Art of Elizabeth Talford Scott,'' which was curated by George Ciscle. That exhibition traveled to the Smithsonian's Anacostia Community Museum, the Southeastern Center for Contemporary Art and the New England Quilt Museum.

The work of Elizabeth Talford Scott can be found in several private and museum collections including the Baltimore Museum of Art, the Delaware Art Museum, the Philbrook Museum of Art, and in exhibitions at Goya Contemporary gallery in Baltimore, MD.

Personal life and legacy
In 1940 upon moving to Baltimore, Elizabeth Caldwell met and married Charlie Scott, Jr. from Durham, NC. They had one daughter, artist Joyce J. Scott (b. 1948). When Joyce was twelve, Elizabeth and Charlie separated. Charlie Scott Jr. died in 2005. Elizabeth and Joyce continued to live together in Baltimore until Elizabeth's death at age 95 in 2011.

References

1916 births
2011 deaths
African-American women artists
American artists
Artists from South Carolina
Quilters
People from Chester, South Carolina
American women artists
20th-century African-American people
21st-century African-American people
20th-century African-American women
21st-century African-American women